Son Myung-soon (Hangul:손명순, Hanja:孫命順)  (also transliterated as Sohn Myung Soon) (born 29 January 1929) is the widow of South Korean President Kim Young-sam. She was the first lady when Kim Young-sam was in office, from 1993 to 1998.

Biography
Son was born in Keishōnan-dō on 29 January 1929 in Chōsen to Sang-ho and Geunyi Kim. She had two sisters who died early and her birth mother died on 1935. Her father later remarried to  Gam Deok-soon, and had two more sons and six more daughters. Her father Sang-ho ran the largest rubber factory in Reisan and was called the “Masan chaebol.”

Son graduated from Jin Young Daechang Elementary School in Gimhae-si, Gyeongsangnam-do and Masan Girls' High School in Changwon. She later attended Ewha Womans University, where she took course in Pharmacy and married Kim Young-sam  in 1951. During her third year in Ewha, a new rule was established, which prohibited marriage of enrolled students. However, with the help of others, even after giving birth to her first child, she kept her marriage secret until graduation and was able to finish her studies.

On December 18, 1992, Kim Young-sam was elected President of South Korea. And when he took office as president on February 24, 1993, Son Myung-soon began working as First Lady of South Korea. As First Lady, she helped to build a restaurant or lounge  in Blue House for attendants, drivers, and female employees. Son was praised for being a quiet helper and for emphasizing the traditional role of women.

Personal life
Son and Kim Young-sam had five children: 3 daughters (Kim Hye-young, Kim Hye-jeong, Kim Hye-suk) and 2 sons (Kim Hyun-cheol, Euncheol Kim). Kim Hyun-cheol currently serves as 	Executive Director of Kim Young-sam Democratic Center.

Honours
:
 Honorary Recipient of the Grand Order of Mugunghwa (1993)

References

1929 births
Living people
First Ladies of South Korea
People from Gimhae
People from South Gyeongsang Province
South Korean Presbyterians
Ewha Womans University alumni